Riverside, also known as "Area 7", is a neighborhood of Cambridge, Massachusetts bounded by Massachusetts Avenue on the east, River Street on the south, the Charles River on the west, and JFK Street on the north. In 2005 it had a population of 11,201 residents in 3,341 households, and the average household income was $40,753.

References 
 Cambridge Police Department

Neighborhoods in Cambridge, Massachusetts